Alexander Nevsky Cathedral may refer to the following (alphabetically by country, then by town):

 Alexander Nevsky Cathedral, Baku in Azerbaijan 
 Alexander Nevsky Cathedral, Sofia in Bulgaria
 Alexander Nevsky Cathedral, Tallinn, Estonia
 Alexander Nevsky Cathedral, Paris, France
 Alexander Nevsky Cathedral, Tiflis, Georgia 
 Alexander Nevsky Cathedral, Łódź, Poland
 Alexander Nevsky Cathedral, Warsaw, Poland 
 Alexander Nevsky Cathedral, Izhevsk, Russia
 Alexander Nevsky Cathedral, Moscow, Russia 
 Alexander Nevsky Cathedral, Nizhny Novgorod, Russia
 Alexander Nevsky Cathedral, Novosibirsk, Russia
 Alexander Nevsky Cathedral, Tver, Russia
 Alexander Nevsky Cathedral, Yalta, Ukraine
Alexander Nevsky Cathedral, Allison Park, Pittsburgh, Pennsylvania, US; under the jurisdiction of the Orthodox Church in America (OCA)
Alexander Nevsky Cathedral, Howell, New Jersey, US; under the jurisdiction of the Russian Orthodox Church Outside of Russia (ROCOR)

See also 
 Alexander Nevsky Lavra, Saint Petersburg, Russia
 Church of St. Alexander Nevsky, Vilnius, Lithuania
 Church of St. Alexander Nevsky, Belgrade, Serbia